Limestone is a community in Carleton County, New Brunswick, Canada, near Route 540.

History

When it was founded in 1834, the community was known as Ivey Corner in honour of two of the first individuals to arrive.

See also
List of communities in New Brunswick

References

Communities in Carleton County, New Brunswick